Patsy Ann Terrell (December 23, 1961  June 7, 2017) was an American politician. A Democrat, Terrell represented the 102nd district in the Kansas House of Representatives from January 9, 2017, until her death in office on June 7, 2017. She was 55 years old when she  died.

Terrell was a native of Paducah, Kentucky, and a self-employed writer who also worked in communications. She received her bachelor's degree in communications from the University of Kentucky. She lived in Hutchinson, Kansas.

References

External links
Kansas election results (hutchnews.com)
Kansas election results (nytimes.com)

1961 births
2017 deaths
Democratic Party members of the Kansas House of Representatives
Women state legislators in Kansas
Politicians from Hutchinson, Kansas
People from Paducah, Kentucky
University of Kentucky alumni
Writers from Kansas
Writers from Kentucky
Kentucky women in politics
Kentucky women writers
21st-century American women politicians
21st-century American politicians